Oxiconazole (trade names Oxistat in the US, Oxizole in Canada) is an antifungal medication typically administered in a cream or lotion to treat skin infections, such as athlete's foot, jock itch and ringworm. It can also be prescribed to treat the skin rash known as tinea versicolor, caused by systemic yeast overgrowth (Candida spp.).

It was patented in 1975 and approved for medical use in 1983.

See also
 Fluconazole

References

External links
 MedlinePlus - Oxiconazole

Chlorobenzenes
Imidazole antifungals
Lanosterol 14α-demethylase inhibitors